Nikola Andrijevic is a Canadian former soccer player who had stints in the USL A-League, and the Canadian Professional Soccer League.

Playing career 
Andrijevic began his career in 2000 with the Toronto Lynx of the USL A-League. He helped Toronto qualify for the postseason for the second time in the club's history, where Toronto would finish third in the Northeast Division. In the playoffs the Lynx faced Richmond Kickers in the first round, and advanced to the next round by a 3-1 goals on aggregate. In the next round Toronto would face the Rochester Rhinos, but would be eliminated from the playoffs by a score of 2-1 on goals on aggregate. In 2001, he signed with Toronto Croatia of the Canadian Professional Soccer League. He made his debut for the organization on June 3, 2001 in a match against North York Astros. In the 2002 season he assisted Toronto in clinching the Western Conference title and securing a postseason berth. He appeared in the semi-final match against North York Astros, but were eliminated from playoff contention by a score of 1-0.

In 2003, Andrijevic was traded to division rivals Hamilton Thunder, where he clinched the Western Conference title. He featured in the semi-final match against Vaughan Sun Devils, where Vaughan was defeated by a score of 2-0. The following season he repeated Hamilton's success by clinching their second division title.

References 

Living people
Canadian Soccer League (1998–present) players
Canadian soccer players
Hamilton Thunder players
Toronto Croatia players
Toronto Lynx players
A-League (1995–2004) players
Canadian people of Croatian descent
Association football forwards
1969 births